The 2011–12 season was Panathinaikos's 53rd consecutive season in Super League Greece.

They also competed in the Greek Cup and were eliminated from the UEFA Champions League and the UEFA Europa League.

Current squad 
As of December 2011

Starting 11

Transfers

In

Out

Pre-season and friendlies

Competitions

Super League Greece

Regular season

League table

Matches

Play-offs

League table

Matches

Greek Cup

Fourth round

Fifth round

UEFA Champions League

Qualifying phase

Third qualifying round

UEFA Europa League

Play-off round

Top goalscorers

16 goals
 Sebastián Leto (15 in Greek League, 1 in Champions League)

13 goals
 Toché (11 in Greek League, 1 in Champions League, 1 in Europa League)

6 goals
 Cleyton (6 in Greek League)

5 goals
 Jean-Alain Boumsong (3 in Greek League,1 in Champions League, 1 in Europa League)

4 goals
 Kostas Katsouranis (4 in Greek League)
 Antonis Petropoulos (3 in Greek League, 1 in Champions League)
 Quincy Owusu-Abeyie (4 in Greek League)

3 goals
Lazaros Christodoulopoulos (3 in Greek League)

2 goals
 Sotiris Ninis (2 in Greek League)
 Josu Sarriegi (2 in Greek League)
 Zeca (2 in Greek League)

1 goal
 Giorgos Karagounis (1 in Greek League)
 Charis Mavrias (1 in Greek League)
 Gergely Rudolf (1 in Greek League)
 Simão (1 in Greek League)
 Loukas Vyntra (1 in Greek Cup)

References

External links
 Panathinaikos FC official website

Panathinaikos
Panathinaikos F.C. seasons
Panathinaikos